TG5 (TeleGiornale 5) is a news programme on the Italian TV channel Canale 5, part of the Mediaset network and owned by MFE - MediaForEurope. It is broadcast domestically on Canale 5 and Mediaset TGcom24 several times a day. The rating for the programme´s 08:00 PM edition, are among the highest for Italian commercial TV. The programme is broadcast from Rome. The editor-in-chief is Clemente Mimun.

Programme format 
The roots of the programme go back to 1980 on Canale 5, with a programme covering Lombardy called Video 5. In 1983 it was replaced by Canale 5 News.

The programme is generally presented by a single newsreader but with additional newsreaders for financial reports. Generally the programme features reports which are preceded and followed by the correspondent reporting live from the scene of the report.

TG5, as it exists today, was created in 1992 with Enrico Mentana as director.

Programmes

 TG5 Mattina and TG5 flash:  Cristina Bianchino, Paolo di Lorenzo, Francesca Cantini, Veronica Gervaso, Roberta Floris 
 TG5 Giorno and TG5 flash: Simona Branchetti, Costanza Calabrese , Domitilla Savignoni, Paola Rivetta, Francesca Cenci 
 TG5 Sera: Cesara Buonamici, Alberto Bila', Elena Guarnieri, Dario Maltese
 TG5 Notte: Lorenzo Montersoli, Antonio Sapio, Paolo Trombin

Editor-in-chief
 1992-2004 - Enrico Mentana
 2004-2007 - Carlo Rossella
 2007-present - Clemente Mimun
 2020 - Mauro Crippa (ad interim)

Mediaset
Mass media in Rome
Italian television news shows
1992 Italian television series debuts
Canale 5 original programming